Gerald R. Crabtree is the David Korn Professor at Stanford University and an Investigator in the Howard Hughes Medical Institute.  He is known for defining the Ca2+-calcineurin-NFAT signaling pathway, pioneering the development of synthetic ligands for regulation of biologic processes and discovering chromatin regulatory mechanisms involved in cancer and brain development. He is a founder of Ariad Pharmaceuticals, Amplyx Pharmaceuticals, and Foghorn Therapeutics.

Education and training
Crabtree grew up near Wellsburg, West Virginia, earned his B.S. in Chemistry and Mathematics from West Liberty State College and his M.D. from Temple University. While at medical school, he became interested in laboratory research and started to work at Dartmouth College with Allan Munck on the biochemistry of steroid hormones.

Key discoveries 1980s,  1990s and 2010s
In the early 1980s Crabtree worked with Albert J. Fornace Jr. to use early bioinformatics approaches to identify remnants of transposition events (rearrangements) in the human genome and to discover the HNF1 transcription factor. In 1982 Crabtree discovered that one gene could produce more than one protein thereby demonstrating that the coding capability of the genome is larger than expected and breaking the long-held dictum: “one gene; one protein."  

Crabtree with postdoctoral fellows David B. Durand and Jeng-Pyng Shaw discovered the antigen receptor response elements and the NFAT transcription complex of the interleukin-2 gene in 1987, which was initially named NF-IL-2E and later renamed NFAT-1.   In the late 1980s and early 1990s Crabtree, along with Stuart Schreiber further defined the Ca2+/calcineurin/ NFAT signaling pathway, which carries signals from the cell surface to the nucleus to activate immune response genes. These discoveries resulted in the first understanding of the mechanism of action of the two most commonly used immunosuppressant drugs: cyclosporine and FK506. Crabtree and Schreiber found that these drugs prevent signals originating at the cell membrane from entering the nucleus by blocking the actions of the phosphatase, calcineurin preventing the entry of the NFATc proteins into the nucleus. NFAT proteins activate a large group of genes necessary for the immune response. When these genes are not activated, as occurs with Cyclosporine or FK506 administration, transplant rejection is prevented. The elucidation of the Ca2+ - Calcineurin-NFAT signaling pathway and the discovery that it is the target of Cyclosporine and FK506 was covered in the New York Times.  Later his laboratory used genetic approaches in mice to show that calcineurin-NFAT signaling plays essential roles in the development of many vertebrate organ systems and its dysregulation is likely to be responsible for many of the phenotypes of Down Syndrome. The understanding of this signaling pathway provided one of the first biochemical bridges from the cell membrane to the nucleus. (see also: Stuart Schreiber).

In 1992, working with Calvin Kuo, then a graduate student in his laboratory, he discovered that the immunosuppressive drug, rapamycin blocked a biochemical pathway leading to protein synthesis in response to membrane cell proliferation signals. This work contributed to the development of rapamycin as a therapeutic for certain human cancers and also played a role in the founding of Ariad Pharmaceuticals in Cambridge, Massachusetts.

In 1993 Crabtree and Stuart Schreiber designed and synthesized the first synthetic ligands to induce proximity of proteins within cells. Crabtree generalized this approach to other types of synthetic ligands including natural molecules involved in plant signaling that have expanded the usefulness of this approach. At present synthetic ligands are being used to probe the function of many signaling pathways and biologic events within cells including receptor action, G-protein activation, non-receptor tyrosine kinase activation, protein stability, apoptotic signaling, transcription, and chromatin regulation. This approach has proved useful in rapidly activating and inactivating molecules to allow one to study their function. Crabtree and colleagues Nathan Hathaway and Oli Bell have used this approach to make the first measurements of the dynamics of chromatin regulation in living cells leading to an understanding of the stability of epigenetic changes involved in cellular memory.  His development of synthetic ligands was covered in the New York Times and also in Discovery Magazine in 1996. Later, Ariad Pharmaceuticals developed this technology for gene therapy and Bellicum Pharmaceuticals was founded on this technology by Crabtree’s former postdoctoral fellow, David Spencer.

In the early 1990s Crabtree worked with Paul Khavari, now the Carl J. Herzog Professor of Medicine at Stanford University, to define the mammalian SWI/SNF or BAF complex by purifying and cloning the genes that encode its subunits. Using biochemical and genetic approaches he discovered that the genes that encode its subunits are put together like letters in a word to give a wide variety of different biological meanings.  In 2009 he worked with postdoctoral fellow, Andrew Yoo to discover a genetic circuitry controlling the assembly of specialized, brain-specific chromatin regulatory complexes necessary for the development of the mammalian nervous system and demonstrated that recapitulating this circuitry in mammalian cells converts human skin cells to neurons.

Crabtree, with graduate student Cigall Kadoch (now at Harvard Medical School) completed the characterization of the subunits of BAF (mSWI/SNF) chromatin remodeling complexes, and found that these complexes contribute to the cause of over 20% of human cancers and can act as either oncogenes or tumor suppressors, potentially opening a new avenue for treatment.

In 2013, Crabtree published "Our Fragile Intellect" in Trends in Genetics, arguing that humanity is becoming increasingly neurologically fragile.  This position has generated a wide debate in the academy.

Selected awards
NIH Director’s Award, 1984
Warner Lambert Park Davis Award, 1986
Howard Hughes Investigator, 1988 to present
Elected to the National Academy of Sciences, 1997
Outstanding Inventor, Stanford University, 2004
Thomas Scientific Laureate in Chemistry with Stuart Schreiber, 2006
Stanford Faculty Mentor of the Year for 2008
David Korn Professorship, 2008
Jacob Javits Neuroscience Award, 2013

Notable students and their current affiliation
Jorge Plutzky, Harvard University
Nikki Holbrook, Yale University
Katharine Ullman, University of Utah
Albert Fornace, Georgetown University
Calvin Kuo, Stanford University
Paul Khavari, Stanford University
Weidong Wang, National Institutes of Health
Keji Zhao, National Institutes of Health
Isabella Graef, Stanford University
Oliver Rando, University of Massachusetts
Paul J. Utz, Stanford University
C.P. Chang, Indiana University
Monte Winslow, Stanford University
Jason Gestwicki, University of California, San Francisco
Joe Arron, Genentech
Julie Lessard, University of Montreal
Jiang Wu, The University of Texas Southwestern Medical Center
Andrew Yoo, Washington University
Nate Hathaway, University of North Carolina
Oliver Bell, Research Institute of Molecular Pathology, Vienna
Diana Hargreaves, Salk Institute for Biological Studies
Emily Dykhuizen, Purdue University
Cigall Kadoch, Harvard University
Andrew Koh, University of Chicago
Simon Braun, University of Geneva, Switzerland

References

External links 
His Academic Bio
His Howard Hughes Medical Institute bio
Crabtree Lab website

Living people
American biochemists
Howard Hughes Medical Investigators
Place of birth missing (living people)
Stanford University School of Medicine faculty
Scientists from the San Francisco Bay Area
Members of the United States National Academy of Sciences
Fellows of the American Academy of Arts and Sciences
1946 births
West Liberty University alumni
People from Wheeling, West Virginia
People from Wellsburg, West Virginia